Kanhan (Pipri) is a census town in Nagpur district in the Indian state of Maharashtra.

Demographics
 India census, Kanhan (Pipri) had a population of 21,840. Males constitute 51% of the population and females 49%. Kanhan (Pipri) has an average literacy rate of 74%, higher than the national average of 59.5%: male literacy is 79%, and female literacy is 67%. In Kanhan (Pipri), 12% of the population is under 6 years of age. Famous river in Kanhan. Very famous SAI BABA Temple in Kanhan. Situated on the banks of River kanhan and named after it. It was predominantly an industrial town on National Highway no. 7 and railway route connecting Mumbai and Kolkata.

References

Cities and towns in Nagpur district